The E&N Rail Trail is a  paved bike and pedestrian trail designed to be a non-motorized recreation and commuter connection to downtown Victoria, British Columbia, Canada and runs through Esquimalt, View Royal, and Langford. The E&N Rail Trail was also designed to connect with existing popular trail systems such as the Galloping Goose Regional Trail or  Lochside Regional Trails. The trail lays alongside a suspended yet active rail line (Southern Railway of Vancouver Island or SVI). The trail is named for SVI's predecessor Esquimalt and Nanaimo Railway.

Construction 
Construction started in 2009, and planned as a multi phase construction throughout the region. The projected costs of the project is estimated at $36,000,000. Primary funding of this project come from the Canadian Federal Government through the following contributions:

 Regionally Significant Projects, Strategic Priorities Gas Tax funding ($14 million)
 The Western Economic Diversification Fund ($1 million)
 Bike BC ($2.7 million) and Local Motion funding ($275,000). 
 The CRD has covers all other costs ($2.2 million)

Construction of this trail is managed by the CRD Regional Parks and CRD Environmental Engineering utilizing municipal and partnerships with local First Nation partners. First Nations partners acknowledged are in Victoria, Esquimalt, View Royal, Langford, Songhees Nation, and the Esquimalt Nation. The Province of BC and Island Corridor Foundation/Southern Rail of Vancouver Island are also construction partners in this project.

References 

Vancouver Island
Rail trails in British Columbia